Nosophora fulvalis is a moth in the family Crambidae. It was described by George Hampson in 1898. It is found in Papua New Guinea, where it has been recorded from Fergusson Island in the D'Entrecasteaux Islands. It is also found on Borneo and in Australia.

References

Moths described in 1898
Spilomelinae
Moths of Asia
Moths of Australia